Tommy McDonald may refer to:
Tommy McDonald (American football) (1934–2018), American football player
Tommy McDonald (footballer, born 1895) (1895–1969), Scottish football forward for Rangers, Newcastle United and York City
Tommy McDonald (footballer, born 1930) (1930–2004), Scottish footballer of the 1950s and 1960s

See also
Tom McDonald (disambiguation)
Thomas McDonald (disambiguation)